Indrek Sei (born 26 July 1972 in Tallinn) is a former freestyle swimmer from Estonia, who competed in three consecutive Summer Olympics for his native country, starting in 1992.

Sei won the bronze medal in the 100m Individual Medley at the European Sprint Swimming Championships 1991 in Gelsenkirchen. A year later in Espoo, Sei repeated that feat.

See also
 List of Estonian records in swimming

References
 

1972 births
Living people
Estonian male freestyle swimmers
Olympic swimmers of Estonia
Swimmers at the 1992 Summer Olympics
Swimmers at the 1996 Summer Olympics
Swimmers at the 2000 Summer Olympics
Swimmers from Tallinn
20th-century Estonian people